Keung Shan (literally "Ginger Mountain") is a peak in Hong Kong, on southwestern Lantau Island, with a height of  above sea level.

Geology

Keung Shan is formed by volcanic rocks, including porphyritic rhyolites, similar to nearby Lantau Peak and Sunset Peak.

Access
The Lantau Trail traverses the summit of this hill.

Villages
The villages of Lower Keung Shan and Upper Keung Shan are located north of the hill. Both are recognised villages under the New Territories Small House Policy. The Keung Shan area, together with Luk Wu, Ngong Ping, Tei Tong Tsai and Man Cheung Po are considered as the five major Buddhist sites of Lantau Island, hosting numerous temples and gardens.

See also
 List of mountains, peaks and hills in Hong Kong

References

External links

 Delineation of area of existing village Keung Shan, Upper and Luk Wu (Tai O) for election of resident representative (2019 to 2022)